Petter Johnsen Ertzgaard (13 August 1784 – 7 February 1848) was a Norwegian farmer, elected official and military officer. He served as a representative at the Norwegian Constitutional Assembly.

Petter Johnsen Ertzgaard was born in Stjørdal in Nord-Trøndelag, Norway. Ertzgaard served as commissioned officer in Det Strindenske Kompani 1807–1817, and participated  during the Jämtland Campaign of 1808. Ertzgaard took over the family farm at Værnes in 1815.  He served as a member of the Conciliation Commission (Forlikskommisjon) for his district since 1830 and was deputy chairman from 1838 to 1839.

He represented Trondhjem Dragon Corps (Trondhjems dragonkorps), together with Frederik Hartvig Johan Heidmann.  at the Norwegian Constituent Assembly at Eidsvoll in 1814. At Eidsvoll, he supported the position of the union party (Unionspartiet) . He was later also a member of the Parliament of Norway in 1830-1835 as a representative from Nordre Trondhjems amt.

References

External links
Representantene på Eidsvoll 1814 (Cappelen Damm AS)
 Men of Eidsvoll (eidsvollsmenn)

Related Reading
Holme Jørn (2014) De kom fra alle kanter - Eidsvollsmennene og deres hus  (Oslo: Cappelen Damm) 

1784 births
1848 deaths
People from Stjørdal
Norwegian Army personnel
Norwegian military personnel of the Napoleonic Wars
Fathers of the Constitution of Norway